Igor Sergeyevich Paderin (born 24 November 1989) is a Russian former professional football player.

Club career
Paderin made his Russian Premier League debut for FC Kuban Krasnodar on 10 June 2011 in a game against FC Amkar Perm.

On 14 February 2020, FC Urartu announced the signing of Paderin. On 9 July 2020, Paderin announced his retirement from football, taking up a position with Urartu's academy. On 18 February 2021 it was confirmed, that Paderin had come out of retirement and again would play for FC Urartu for the 2021 season.

References

External links
 
 

1989 births
Sportspeople from Omsk
Living people
Russian footballers
Russian expatriate footballers
Association football forwards
FC Kuban Krasnodar players
FC Tyumen players
FC Armavir players
FC Amkar Perm players
Ulisses FC players
FC Oryol players
FC Urartu players
Russian Premier League players
Russian First League players
Russian Second League players
Armenian Premier League players
Expatriate footballers in Georgia (country)
Expatriate footballers in Armenia
Russian expatriate sportspeople in Georgia (country)
Russian expatriate sportspeople in Armenia
FC Torpedo Vladimir players